The Philadelphia & Reading Railroad Mule Bridge is a bridge spanning the Schulykill River at the foot of Shurs Lane in Philadelphia, Philadelphia County, Pennsylvania. The bridge is significant for being one of the oldest surviving wrought iron lattice truss bridges.

See also

List of bridges documented by the Historic American Engineering Record in Pennsylvania
List of crossings of the Schuylkill River

References

External links
 

Bridges in Philadelphia
Historic American Engineering Record in Philadelphia